Puerto Rico competed at the 2022 World Athletics Championships in Eugene, Oregon from 15 to 24 July 2022. Puerto Rico had entered 8 athletes.

Medalists

Results

Men
Combined events – Decathlon

Women
Track and road events

Field events

References

Puerto Rico
World Championships in Athletics
2022